The Kerka (Kerkás, Prekmurje Slovene: Kerka) is a river of Slovenia and Hungary. It is a left tributary of the Ledava near Kerkaszentkirály. In its upper course, upstream from its confluence with the Little Kerka (Kis-Kerka) south of Bajánsenye, it is also called Big Kerka (Prekmurje Slovene: Velka Kerka).

See also 
List of rivers of Slovenia

References

Bibliography

External links
 Condition of Big Krka - graph of flow data for the past 30 days (taken in Hodoš by ARSO)

Rivers of Prekmurje
Rivers of Hungary
International rivers of Europe